Humrahi is a social drama series broadcast on Doordarshan network in the early 1990s. It was written by  Manohar Shyam Joshi and directed by Kunwar Sinha.

The series showed a family dealing with problems within their home and society. Himani Shivpuri made her debut in the negative role of Devaki Bhaujai (or Bhojai, another word for Bhabhi) and her character was very popular. The show had an ensemble cast including Sadiya Siddiqui as Angoori, Anang Desai, Gopi Desai, Mohan Bhandari and others.

The title song of the show was "Yahin kahin par hai, teri meri manzil".

The story was about three brothers and their interrelated families.

Cast
 Himani Shivpuri as Devaki Bhaujai
 Sadiya Siddiqui as Angoori
 Varun Gautam  as Gyarsa
 Anang Desai
 Gopi Desai
 Mohan Bhandari

References 

DD National original programming
1994 Indian television series debuts